Selnica ob Muri is a settlement in the Slovene Hills east of Šentilj v Slovenskih Goricah in the Municipality of Šentilj in northeastern Slovenia.

References

External links
Selnica ob Muri on Geopedia

Populated places in the Municipality of Šentilj